The 2003 Hungaroring F3000 round was a motor racing event held on 23 August 2003 at the Hungaroring, Mogyoród, Hungary. It was the ninth round of the 2003 International Formula 3000 Championship, and was held in support of the 2003 Hungarian Grand Prix.

This was the first Formula 3000 race to feature been introduced mandatory pit stop.

Classification

Qualifying

Race

See also 
 2003 Hungarian Grand Prix

References

International Formula 3000